Mud are an English glam rock band, formed in February 1966. Their earlier success came in a pop and then glam rock style, while later hits were influenced by 1950s rock and roll, and they are best remembered for their hit singles "Dyna-mite" , "Tiger Feet", which was the UK's best-selling single of 1974, and "Lonely This Christmas" which reached Christmas number 1 in December 1974. After signing to Rak Records and teaming up with songwriters/producers Nicky Chinn and Mike Chapman, the band had fourteen UK Top 20 hits between 1973 and 1976, including three number ones.

History

Mud I

1966–1972: the early years 
The band was founded by lead guitarist Rob Davis, lead vocalist Les Gray, drummer Dave Mount (born 3 March 1947, Carshalton; died 2 December 2006, St Helier Hospital, Carshalton) and bassist Ray Stiles (born 20 November 1946, Guildford, Surrey).

The band released their debut single "Flower Power" on CBS in 1967, but were not immediately successful.  Three further singles in 1967/68, "Up the Airy Mountain"/"The Latter Days", "Shangri-La"/"House on the Hill" and "Jumping Jehosophat"/"Won't Let It Go", made no impression on the UK Singles Chart.

The band appeared on The Basil Brush Show on BBC TV, and toured as support for Jack Jones.

1973–1976: the golden years 

After years of unsuccessful singles, they were signed to Mickie Most's Rak label, and had three Top 20 successes in 1973 with "Crazy" (No. 12), "Hypnosis" (No. 16) and "Dyna-mite" (No. 4).

At the peak of their career, they also enjoyed British number one singles with "Tiger Feet"; and "Lonely This Christmas" (1974), an affectionate Elvis Presley pastiche; plus "Oh Boy" (1975), a cover of the Buddy Holly hit, which also featured on their album Mud Rock Volume 2. "Tiger Feet" sold over 500,000 copies in the UK and a million copies globally.

Like contemporaries Sweet, their most successful period came when their records were written and produced by Nicky Chinn and Mike Chapman: in 1975 they had seven singles in the UK Top 40 totalling over 45 weeks on the chart, the most by any artist in 1975. "Oh Boy" was the only number one single produced by Chinn and Chapman that they did not also write.

"Lonely This Christmas" gets seasonal airplay on British radio and television, (along with Slade's "Merry Xmas Everybody" and Wizzard's "I Wish It Could Be Christmas Everyday"). The band also embraced the burgeoning disco craze, as exemplified on their 1976 single "Shake It Down" which reached No. 12 in the UK chart. After "Tiger Feet" they released "The Cat Crept In" which reached No. 2 in April 1974, which was written to exploit Les Gray's vocal impression of Presley. Their next single "Rocket" reached No. 6 in the UK, after which they released another track from their album Mud Rock, a cover of "In the Mood". This was released under the name of "Dum" ("Mud" spelt backwards), but it failed to chart.

After the success with "Lonely This Christmas", they cracked the Valentine's Day market with "The Secrets That You Keep", which reached No. 3 in February 1975. Around this time Mud wound up their contract with Rak releasing three further singles, "Oh Boy" (their third and final UK No. 1), "Moonshine Sally" (No. 10) and "One Night" (No. 32). Mud also split from Chinn and Chapman in mid-1975 and signed to Private Stock (licensed to Philips in Continental Europe).  There they enjoyed three more British Top 20 hits within seven months: "L'L'Lucy" (No. 10), the ballad "Show Me You're a Woman" (No. 8) and the disco-influenced track "Shake It Down" (No. 12). The latter two singles saw them gradually moving away from glam rock, which was now unfashionable. Keyboardist Andy Ball, formerly of Candlewick Green, joined the band briefly during this period, to be replaced in early 1978 by Brian Tatum.

Their last single to reach the British charts was a cover of the Bill Withers song "Lean on Me" which reached No. 7 in the UK in December 1976.

1977–1979: downfall to disbanding 
"Lean on me" was followed by in 1977 Gray's solo version of "Groovy Kind of Love" on Warner Bros., which peaked at No. 32 in the UK. Also in 1977, with Private Stock in financial difficulties, the band moved to RCA. Their first single on RCA was "Slow Talking Boy", a folk rock song composed by John Kongos, and featuring Davis playing a Vox 12-string guitar-mandolin; they performed this song on BBC TV's Top of the Pops, but without reaping any chart success. Mud's next single, "(Just Try) A Little Tenderness", was their final appearance on any major national chart, stalling at No. 98 in Australia. Three more singles, all cover versions, followed in 1978 before RCA dropped the band and Gray quit for a solo career. 

The original band continued for a short while with female vocalist Margo Buchanan in Gray's place, releasing an unsuccessful single for Carrere, before finally disbanding in 1979.

Aftermath 
Following the band's dissolution, Stiles joined the Hollies; whilst Davis went on to co-write several highly successful dance hits for Kylie Minogue and Spiller featuring Sophie Ellis-Bextor. Drummer Mount went into the insurance business. Mount appeared on an episode of Never Mind the Buzzcocks on BBC Two in November 2005, and featured in the "spot the pop star of the past" identity parade segment. Mount died on 2 December 2006. He had been married twice and worked as a salesman latterly. His obituary appeared in The Independent newspaper. The last performance by the four original members was on 3 March 1990 at Dave Mount's wedding; a video recording of which was made by Mount.

1980–2004: Les Gray's Mud 
After the original band broke up in 1979, Gray reformed the band as 'Les Gray's Mud'. The initial lineup featured Stuart Amesbury (rhythm guitar) and Cherie Beck (backing vocals) of the Bristol-based Cherie Beck Band; together with Dale Fry (bass), Nick Richie (lead guitar) and Rob John (drums); with the latter two being replaced in 1983 by guitarist Tim Fish and drummer Mark Hatwood respectively. In 1985, a further lineup change saw Amesbury, Beck, and Fry depart the band; with the new lineup being rounded out by Kevin Fairburn on bass.

In 1987, all members with the exception of Gray departed the band, and Gray brought in bassist John Berry, drummer Wole Rothe, and guitarist Syd Twynham as replacements. Rothe and Twynham had both been members of Liquid Gold prior to joining Mud. This lineup lasted until 1998 when Rothe was replaced by Phil Wilson, and the band underwent no further changes until Gray died in 2004.

2005–present: Mud II 
Following Gray's death, the three remaining members were given permission by the other founding members of Mud, plus that of Gray's family, to continue using the band's name. Berry, Twynham, and Wilson then rechristened the band 'Mud II' and recruited keyboardist and longterm Mud collaborator Chris Savage. The following year, Berry left and was replaced by Marc Michalski, creating the lineup of the band which still continues to this day.

A short version of "Tiger Feet" was played at the opening ceremony of the 2012 Summer Olympics.

Personnel

Members

Current members
 Rob Davis- lead guitar, vocals (1966 –present) 
 Ray Stiles - bass guitar, lead vocals (1966 –present) 
 Keith Read - guitar (2015 –present) 
 Pete Phipps - drums (2015 –present) 

Former members
 Les Gray - lead vocals, keyboards (1966–1978, 1980–2004; his death)
 Dave Mount - drums, percussion (1966–1979; died 2006)
 Andy Ball - keyboards (1974–1976)
 Margo Buchanan - lead vocals (1978–1979)
Mud II former members
 Stuart Amesbury - rhythm guitar (1980–1985)
 Cherie Beck - backing vocals (1980–1985)
 Dale Fry - bass guitar (1980–1985)
 Rob John - drums, percussion (1980–1983)
 Nick Richie - lead guitar (1980–1983)
 Tim Fish - lead guitar (1983–1987)
 Mark Hatwood - drums, percussion (1983–1987)
 Kevin Fairburn - bass guitar (1985–1987)
 John Berry - bass guitar (1987–2005)
 Wole Rother - drums, percussion (1987–1998)

Lineups

Timeline

Discography

Mud Rock (1974)
Mud Rock Vol. 2 (1975)
Use Your Imagination (1975)
It's Better Than Working (1976)
Rock On (1978)
As You Like It (1979)
Mud Featuring Les Gray (1982)

References

External links

 Mud biography at the Allmusic website
 David Proffitt's Mud tribute pages
 BBC Top of the Pops Mud section
 Mud's discography, chart positions
 Mud CD reissues available

Musical groups established in 1968
English glam rock groups
Musical quartets
Rak Records artists